Andrew George "Bill" Eaton (29 November 1931 – 22 May 2011) was an Australian politician. He was a Member of the Queensland Legislative Assembly.

Early life 
Eaton was born in Gilgandra in New South Wales to Cyril Allan Dudley Eaton and Mary Catherine, née O'Donohue. He attended Dobies Bight State School and St Mary's Convent in Casino. In 1931 he married Shirley Daw Boothman; they had four children, but Shirley died of leukaemia shortly after their fourth child's birth. Eaton worked as a labourer, fencer, timber cutter, stationhand and machinery operator, and from 1963 he was the leading hand of a live-line gang with the Far North Queensland Electricity Board.

Politics 
In 1980, Eaton was elected to the Queensland Legislative Assembly as the Labor member for Mourilyan. In 1983 he was promoted to the front bench as Opposition Spokesman for Water Resources and Maritime Services, and upon Labor's victory in 1989 he became Minister for Land Management. His seat was abolished in 1992 and largely merged with the neighbouring National-held seat of Hinchinbrook. The merged seat was notionally Labor-held, but Eaton lost a close contest to National's Marc Rowell.

Later life 
Eaton died on 22 May 2011 in Cairns.

References

1931 births
2011 deaths
Members of the Queensland Legislative Assembly
People from New South Wales
Australian Labor Party members of the Parliament of Queensland